George Blagojevic (born 18 October 1996) is an Australian professional basketball player for the Geelong Supercats of the NBL1 South. Blagojevic played college basketball for the Hartford Hawks.

Early life
Blagojevic grew up in Geelong and played for the Basketball Australia Centre of Excellence at the Australian Institute of Sport. During the 2014-15 season, he averaged 8.8 points and 3.2 rebounds per game in South East Australian Basketball League competition. In March 2019, Blagojevic committed to Hartford over Boise State, Saint Mary's and Grand Canyon.

College career
Blagojevic averaged 9.5 points and 4.1 rebounds per game as a freshman. As a sophomore, his averages declined to 4.4 points and 3.0 rebounds per game. Blagojevic averaged 4.5 points and 3.7 assists per game as a junior. On February 27, 2019, he scored a career-high 32 points in a 96-76 win against Binghamton. As a senior, Blagojevic averaged 14.3 points, 7.5 rebounds, 1.9 assists and 1.2 steals per game. He was named to the Second Team All-America East. Blagojevic finished his career with 1,032 points and 578 rebounds.

Professional career
After graduating from Hartford, Blagojevic signed with the Cairns Marlins of the Queensland Basketball League in May 2019 for the remainder of the season. He averaged 12.2 points and 7.5 rebounds per game and finished the regular season with a double-double of 24 points and 10 rebounds against Gladstone Port City Power. On 14 August 2019, Blagojevic signed a one-year deal with the Cairns Taipans of the National Basketball League (NBL). He re-signed with the team on 3 September 2020. On 10 June 2021, Blagojevic signed with the Geelong Supercats of the NBL1 South.

National team career
Blagojevic has represented Australia in several international tournaments. At the 2014 FIBA U18 Oceania Tournament, Blagojevic averaged 14.4 points, 6.6 rebounds, and 1.8 assists per game. He was named to the roster for the 2015 FIBA Under-19 World Championship. In 2019, he helped Australia win bronze at the Summer Universiade in Italy. Blagojevic averaged 5.3 points and 2.0 rebounds per game in six games.

References

External links 
Hartford Hawks bio

1996 births
Living people
Australian men's basketball players
Australian expatriate basketball people in the United States
Sportspeople from Geelong
Power forwards (basketball)
Cairns Taipans players
Hartford Hawks men's basketball players
Universiade medalists in basketball
Universiade bronze medalists for Australia
Medalists at the 2019 Summer Universiade